Music of Malawi has historically been influenced through its triple cultural heritage of British, African, and American music.  Malawians have long been travelers and migrant workers, and as a result, their music has spread across the African continent and blended with other music forms.  One of the prime historical causes of the Malawian musical melting pot was World War II, when soldiers both brought music to distant lands and also brought them back.  By the end of the war, guitar and banjo duos were the most popular type of dance bands.  Both instruments were imported. Malawians working in the mines in South Africa and Mozambique also led to fusion and blending in music styles, giving rise to music styles like Kwela.

During the colonial period, Malawi saw rise to very few well-known singers. One such singer was Tony Bird a folk rock singer-songwriter who was born in Nyasaland and performed anti-colonial music about life for regular Malawians during the colonial period.  His music is described as a fusion of Malawian and Afrikaner traditions. His popular style led him to tour with Ladysmith Black Mambazo in the 1980s.

Under President Hastings Banda, the Malawian state censored music that it deemed to be of a sexual or politically subversive nature. This led to few internationally renowned artists entering the international arena from 1964-1994. After the country's first multiparty elections in 1994, however, many artists could now practice their art publicly, and Malawian music began to grow and develop into the music forms that can be heard coming out of Malawi now.

Since 1994, the country has seen a steady growth in its music industries and in its local celebrities. Due to the period of music suppression, many of Malawi's new and up-and-coming artists are young. Artists like Young Kay are being supported by the veterans in the industry and are working together to give Malawian music a distinct new identity.

Many local artists are also making headway internationally. 
Contemporary well-known international artists from Malawi are Wambali Mkandawire, Erik Paliani, Lucius Banda, Tay Grin, Esau Mwamwaya, Tsar Leo, Lawrence Khwisa (LULU).  In 2015 Malawian music was recognized in the 58th Grammy Awards for the first time, with the nomination of Zomba Prison Project I Have No Everything Here for Best World Music Album.

Music of Malawi

Kwela Music
In the late 1960s, South African kwela music was popular in Malawi. The country produced its own kwela stars that were not as popular as the South African counterparts, but contemporary Kwela artists like Daniel Kachamba & His Kwela Band have enjoyed popularity. South African Kwela music was first created by Malawian immigrants who, upon moving to South Africa, fused their music with local sounds. The word, 'Kwela', in Chichewa means 'to climb' which is similar to the South African definition, which means to "get up" or "rise".

Malawian jazz
Malawian jazz bands also became popular.  In spite of the name, Malawian jazz has little in common with its American namesake.  Rural musicians played acoustic instruments, often in very traditional ways.  These performers include Jazz Giants, Linengwe River Band, Mulanje Mountain Band and Chimvu Jazz.  By the beginning of the 1970s, electric guitars had become common and American rock and roll, soul and funk influences the music scene, resulting in a fusion called afroma. New Scene, led by Morson Phuka, was the most well-known exponent of afroma.

Contemporary Malawian jazz artists include Wambali Mkandawire, South-Africa-based Ray Phiri and US-based Masauko Chipembere Jr.

Jazz concerts can be seen throughout Malawi. Many Malawian Jazz band perform regularly at local hotels and clubs. Sunday Jazz is a popular event in many lodges and hotels in Malawi, where it is a social event for people in the suburban areas to meet and listen to Jazz music on Sundays.

Malawian kwasa kwasa
Influenced by the 1980s music from the Congo, Malawi's own kwasa kwasa music grew. The 1980s saw soukous from the Democratic Republic of the Congo (then Zaire) become popular, and result in a Malawian variety called kwasa kwasa.

Malawian hip-hop/rap

Since 1994, rap has surged in Malawi from urban centers such as Blantyre and Lilongwe to rural areas as Nkhata Bay or Chitipa. Rap scenes in Malawi has been connected through nation-wide institutional networks of radio and newspapers. Hip Hop culture from the United States, South Africa, the United Kingdom and the Caribbean arrived through satellite television and video cassettes.

Malawian urban music began with the group Real Elements, who brought to Malawi an urban American sound with chichewa lyrics. They were featured on channel O and performed in Malawi and opened in the UK for hip hop artists like Blak Twang. They inspired a new genre of Malawian music in the form of the urban hip-hop and rap music styles that was uniquely Malawian.

Since the days of the Real Elements, the Malawian hip-hop genre has grown. This includes Young Kay, Third Eye a.k.a. Mandela Mwanza, Phyzix, Dominant 1, Incyt, Cyclone, A.B, The Basement, Pittie Boyz, The Daredevilz, Lomwe, the Legendary Barryone, Nthumwi Pixy, Biriwiri, Renegade & Pilgrim, Jay-T Pius Parsley as well as international stars like Tay Grin, Gwamba, South African based St Bosseratti.

The hip hop scene in Malawi continues to evolve with new school artists like Gwamba and Marste. Home Grown African, Tsar Leo and Lxrry are some the different hip hop acts that are making news as part of the new school but with an international appeal to their music. Rap and ragga competitions sponsored by private organizations are a common showcase for young performers.

English is the most used language of Malawi rap music, including newspapers articles, discussions among youths, and radio broadcasts. However, for certain situations Chichewa is considered a most appropriate language.

Malawian gospel music
Gospel music is one of Malawi's most popular music forms. It became popular in the 1990s. Pope John Paul II's 1989 visit did much to inspire the rise in gospel music, which was also fueled by the country's economic conditions and poverty. Popular Malawian gospel artists include Ndirande Anglican Voices, Ethel Kamwendo-Banda, Grace Chinga, Lloyd Phiri, George Mkandawire and the Chitheka Family.

As some secular artists become 'born again', Malawi has seen a rise in the diversification of gospel music, particularly in the urban genre. Early hip hop rappers include Chart Rock and The Strategy. Currently, David (formerly Stix from Real Elements, KBG the founder of NyaLimuziK  and Gosple (Aubrey Mvula)  are now the leaders in this form of gospel rap.

As we continue analysing the impact and growth of gospel hip hop or urban music, we cannot just go without mentioning two other up-coming members in this section; based in Lilongwe, the popularly known area 18 youthful crew, the Brothers In Christ (BIC) and the King of Malawi Gospel House beatz DJ Kali have taken the spreading of the gospel to greater heights.

Malawian R&B
Malawi's genre R& B is growing and has been made popular with artists like Maskal, Theo Thomson, Sonye and Dan Lu. There has also been other new upcoming Artists like, Kumbu, Bucci, and Kell Kay, Tremone Trun.

Malawian reggae

Reggae has always been popular in Malawi. Malawian reggae has become immensely popular in recent years, especially amongst the Malawian Rastafarians and along the tourist-filled lakefront.
Music groups such as the Black Missionaries have become one of the most popular reggae bands in Malawi.
Individual artists like Lucius Banda, and Evison Matafale helped to bring the Malawian music scene on the national and international scene. There are also various growing roots rock reggae bands playing their own international standard music such as Fostered Legacy, Soul Raiders, and Wailing Brothers whom their contributions to music has been outstanding. The Malawian reggae music has been music of resistance and of struggle. Many of the themes in the music center around injustice, corruption and equality for all people of Malawi.

Malawian traditional music and dances
Traditional Malawian music has also found some commercial success, like the folk fusionists Pamtondo, whose music uses rhythms from the Lomwe, Makuwa and Mang'anja peoples.  There have also been more traditionalist performers and banda, like Alan Namoko, Micheal Yekha, Ndingo brothers, Millennium Sound Checks and Waliko Makhala. In Malawi traditional dances include Manganje, Mganda, Tchopa, Beni, Malipenga, Ngoma, Chitelera, Likwata, Chiwoda, Masewe, Chimtali, Visekese, Khunju, Gule wa Mkulu and Chisamba.

Malawian pop/fusion
Malawian artists have been known to creatively mix rock, r&b, and the American urban sound to create vibrant fusion music. One such artist is Esau Mwamwaya whose music fuses traditional Malawian, pop and urban sounds.

Music production 
Before 1968, recordings in Malawi were made by mobile recording studios, and by the Federal Broadcasting Studios in Lusaka, Zambia. Nzeru Record Company (NRC), established in 1968, was the first recording studio in Malawi. However, the studio disappeared in 1972 due to a limited local market.

Between 1972 and 1989, most of the recordings were made in the studios of Radio Malawi, later called the Malawi Broadcasting Corporation. As the broadcaster was controlled by the government, the studios helped to filtrate music. Music was recorded in open-reel tapes and never was released on vinyl.

In 1988, the liberalization of the economy and the establishment of the Copyright Act of 1988 allowed entrepreneurs to found their own studios. At the end of the 1990s, small independent studios spread in Blantyre, Balaka, and Lilongwe.

The Church in Malawi opened Andiamo Studios, where the Christian Alleluya Band recorded its first album on cassette in 1988. In 1991, Alleluya Band's guitarist Paul Banda started Imbirani Yahwe Studios in Balaka Town. Since then, most of the Musicians in Malawi expect to have their own recording studio. For that reason, it's hard to find professionally-run recording studios in the country and record labels often have short lives. In some cases, music projects in Malawi are recorded by multiple studios.

Blantyre is the home of most Malawi recording studios. Young musicians interested in recording their song will record in recording studios which offer accessible options for recording a single (generally, one copy of the song) and then give them to a deejay with the hope they play the song on the air.

International music scene
There is a Malawi Broadcasting Corporation, and frequent listeners to "Radio One" will know that Malawi's favorite foreign artists are Don Williams, Jim Reeves, Shaggy, Judy Boucher and South Africans Lucky Dube and Brenda Fassie.

Music festivals

 In 2004, Englishman Will Jameson started Lake of Stars Music Festival which has international artists and Malawians performing together. It currently has been voted by the British newspapers The Independent and the Times as one of the top 20 Music festivals in the world.
 Since the advent of Lake of Stars, Malawi has seen a myriad of festivals pop up, some longer lived than other. 
 Sand Fest 
 Tumaini is a free festival organised in Dzaleka refugee camp. 
 2021 Saw the first edition of Zomba City Festival after cancelling the previous year due to Corona. Zomba City Festival is an annual event, taking place on Labour Day weekend. Zomba City Festival aims to showcase the attractivity of Zomba to its visitors.
 Also in 2021, Lifest was organized, a music festival in Lilongwe, Malawi's Capital.

Notable Malawian musicians
 Joseph Tembo
 Black Missionaries
 Lucius Banda
 Tony Bird
 Erik Paliani
 Masauko Chipembere Jr
 Tay Grin (Limbani Kalinani)
 Evison Matafale
 Michael-Fredrick Paul Sauka
 Esau Mwamwaya
 Ritaa
 Real Elements
 Wambali Mkandawire
 Ray Phiri
 Gwamba
 Zomba Prison Project
 Tsar Leo
 Home Grown African
 Young Kay
 Blasto

References

 Lwanda, John. "Sounds Afroma!". 2000. In: Broughton, Simon and Ellingham, Mark with McConnachie, James and Duane, Orla (Ed.), World Music Vol. 1: Africa, Europe and the Middle East. pp 533–538. Rough Guides Ltd, Penguin Books.

Related links
 keepitmusic.com
 malawi-music.com
 joynathu.com
 mikozinetwork.com
 musicofmalawi.wordpress.com
 lakeofstars.org

Interview with Kenny Gilmore director of Deep Roots Malawi 

Deep Roots Malawi the Official Film directed by Kenny Gilmore